Penbay International Circuit (PIC) is a motor sport circuit in Donggang Township, Pingtung County, Taiwan. It has five configurations. It officially opened on 9 October 2011.

Irish driver Gary Thompson helped officially open Taiwan's all-new circuit by driving a Minardi F1 two seater race car around the track.

Circuit manager Xu Hong-Bin claims that the track is the first circuit in Taiwan to satisfy FIA Grade 2 standard and from 2012 the track will host international events.

The track was closed on 16 July 2019, with only the nearby go-kart track remaining open.

2012 Lamborghini Blancpain Super Trofeo Asia
Automobili Lamborghini and Blancpain announced a new series, 2012 Lamborghini Blancpain Super Trofeo Asia, to run alongside the established European competition. Building on the series' success, the Asian Lamborghini Blancpain Super Trofeo will debut in Sepang, Malaysia in May 2012 with five further race weekends across Japan, China and Taiwan, possibly at Penbay. But the track failed to receive its FIA certification in time to host the race.

Notes

References

External links

 

Defunct motorsport venues
Motorsport venues in Taiwan
Buildings and structures in Pingtung County
Tourist attractions in Pingtung County
2011 establishments in Taiwan
2019 disestablishments in Taiwan